Lemyra proteus is a moth of the family Erebidae. It was described by Joseph de Joannis in 1928. It is found in China (Guangdong, Guangxi, Hainan) and Vietnam.

References

 

proteus
Moths described in 1928